James D. Griffin is an American physician-scientist. He is currently Professor of Medicine at Harvard Medical School, Chair of Medical Oncology at Dana–Farber Cancer Institute, and Director of Medical Oncology at Brigham and Women's Hospital. He is considered an expert in medical oncology and is widely recognized for his research in the clinical and biologic aspects of hemotologic malignancies.

Griffin completed a Bachelor of Arts at Brown University in 1970. He attended Harvard Medical School, earning his M.D. in 1974. Griffin completed his residency at Johns Hopkins Hospital, a hematology fellowship at Massachusetts General Hospital, and a medical oncology fellowship at Dana–Farber Cancer Institute.

He is on the scientific advisory boards of Phio Pharmaceuticals, the Georgetown Lombardi Comprehensive Cancer Center, and the Johns Hopkins Cancer Center.

Griffin was born in Syracuse, New York. He is a seventh-generation Irish American.

References

External links 

 

American oncologists
Cancer researchers
Brown University alumni
Harvard Medical School alumni
Harvard Medical School faculty
Living people
Year of birth missing (living people)
People from Syracuse, New York